The list of Quebec by-elections includes every by-election held in the Canadian province of Quebec since Confederation. By-elections occur whenever there is a vacancy in the National Assembly (known as the Legislative Assembly until 1968), although an imminent general election may allow the vacancy to remain until the dissolution of parliament.

Causes
A by-election occurs whenever there is a vacancy in the Quebec legislature. Vacancies can occur for the following reasons:

 Death of a member. 
 Resignation of a member. 
 Voided results 
 Expulsion from the legislature. 
 Ineligibility to sit.
 Appointment to the Legislative Council, Quebec's appointed upper house, which was abolished in 1968.
 Appointment to the cabinet. Until 1927 incumbent members recontested their seats upon being appointed to Cabinet. These Ministerial by-elections were almost always uncontested.

43rd National Assembly of Quebec 2022–present

42nd National Assembly of Quebec 2018–2022

41st National Assembly of Quebec 2014–2018

40th National Assembly of Quebec 2012–2014

39th National Assembly of Quebec 2008–2012

 Tomassi was a former Liberal

38th National Assembly of Quebec 2007–2008

37th National Assembly of Quebec 2003–2007

36th National Assembly of Quebec 1998–2003

35th National Assembly of Quebec 1994–1998

Therien was a former Liberal

34th National Assembly of Quebec 1989–1994

Larouche was a former Liberal

33rd National Assembly of Quebec 1985–1989

32nd National Assembly of Quebec 1981–1985

31st National Assembly of Quebec 1976–1981

30th National Assembly of Quebec 1973–1976

29th National Assembly of Quebec 1970–1973

28th Legislative/National Assembly of Quebec 1966–1970
Upon the abolition of the Legislative Council on December 31, 1968, the Legislative Assembly of Quebec is renamed the National Assembly of Quebec

 Aquin was a former Liberal

27th Legislative Assembly of Quebec 1962–1966

26th Legislative Assembly of Quebec 1960–1962

25th Legislative Assembly of Quebec 1956–1960

† Won by acclamation

24th Legislative Assembly of Quebec 1952–1956

23rd Legislative Assembly of Quebec 1948–1952

† Won by acclamation

22nd Legislative Assembly of Quebec 1944–1948

21st Legislative Assembly of Quebec 1939–1944

20th Legislative Assembly of Quebec 1936–1939

19th Legislative Assembly of Quebec 1935–1936
no by-elections

18th Legislative Assembly of Quebec 1931–1935

† Won by acclamation

17th Legislative Assembly of Quebec (1927–1931) 

† Won by acclamation

16th Legislative Assembly of Quebec 1923–1927

15th Legislative Assembly of Quebec 1919–1923

† Won by acclamation

14th Legislative Assembly of Quebec 1916–1919

† Won by acclamation

13th Legislative Assembly of Quebec 1912–1916

† Won by acclamation

12th Legislative Assembly of Quebec 1908–1912

† Won by acclamation

11th Legislative Assembly of Quebec 1904–1908

† Won by acclamation

10th Legislative Assembly of Quebec 1900–1904

† Won by acclamation

9th Legislative Assembly of Quebec 1897–1900

† Won by acclamation

8th Legislative Assembly of Quebec 1892–1897

† Won by acclamation

7th Legislative Assembly of Quebec 1890–1891

† Won by acclamation

6th Legislative Assembly of Quebec 1886–1890

† Won by acclamation

 The Parti National was the official name of the Quebec Liberal Party during this period

5th Legislative Assembly of Quebec 1881–1886

† Won by acclamation

4th Legislative Assembly of Quebec 1878–1881

† Won by acclamation

 Flynn and Pacquet were former Liberals who crossed the floor to topple the Joly government

3rd Legislative Assembly of Quebec 1875–1878

† Won by acclamation

2nd Legislative Assembly of Quebec 1871–1875

† Won by acclamation

1st Legislative Assembly of Quebec 1867–1871

† Won by acclamation

References

http://www.quebecpolitique.com/elections-et-referendums/elections-partielles/
http://www.assnat.qc.ca/en/patrimoine/chronologie/index.html
http://www.assnat.qc.ca/en/patrimoine/partielles.html
http://www.assnat.qc.ca/en/patrimoine/resultatselec/index.html

See also
 List of federal by-elections in Canada

By-elections
Provincial by-elections in Quebec
Elections, by-elections
Quebec, by-ele